Clemensia chala is a moth of the family Erebidae first described by William Schaus in 1921. It is found in Guatemala.

References

Cisthenina
Moths described in 1921